The 1984 All-Ireland Senior Camogie Championship was the high point of the 1984 season. The championship was won by Dublin who defeated Tipperary by a 14-point margin in the final. The match drew an attendance of 4,219.

Quarter-finals
Dublin defeated Kilkenny by 6–6 to 4–4 in the preliminary round on a day Angela Downey scored 4-3 of Kilkenny;’s 4-4 total. Marie Connell got three goals for Dublin, Joan Gormley two and Barbara Redmond the sixth.

Semi-finals
A last-minute goal by Genny English, a cousin of Nicholas English, forced the Tipperary-Wexford semi-final to a replay. Tipperary had a two-minute lead with three minutes to go when Nancy Griffin sealed their place in the final.

Final
Dublin's victory came at the third attempt in successive finals. Their first goal came from right full back Germaine Noonan in the 13th minute when her long shot was let drop through the fingers of Tipperary goalkeeper Breda Kennedy. Three minutes later Marie Connell struck for a second goal and Dublin were not caught afterwards. They led by 3-5 to 0-2 at half time. Sean Kilfeather wrote in the Irish Times:
With the wind behind them Dulbi started strongly and, driving the ball great distances, they kept Tipperary under a constant barrage in the early part of the game. Tipperary kept their heads under pressure, however, and might have taken the lead but for a splendid save by the Dublin goalkeeper Yvonne Redmond from a shot by Deirdre Lane. By the 13th minute Tipperary were quite happy to be in arrears by only two points.

Final stages

MATCH RULES
50 minutes
Replay if scores level
Maximum of 3 substitutions

See also
 All-Ireland Senior Hurling Championship
 Wikipedia List of Camogie players
 National Camogie League
 Camogie All Stars Awards
 Ashbourne Cup

References

External links
 Camogie Association
 All-Ireland Senior Camogie Championship: Roll of Honour
 Camogie on facebook
 Historical reports of All Ireland finals
 Camogie on GAA Oral History Project

1984 in camogie
1984